Acheilognathus imberbis is a species of ray-finned fish in the genus Acheilognathus.  It is endemic to the Zhejiang, Shandong, Hubei, Hunan, Sichuan and Jiangsu provinces of China.  Its common length is 6.7 cm.

References

Acheilognathus
Fish described in 1868
Taxa named by Albert Günther
Freshwater fish of China